Wendy Esmeralda Hernández Hernández (born 20 March 1996) is a Salvadoran footballer who plays as a defender. She has been a member of the El Salvador women's national team.

International career
Hernández capped for El Salvador at senior level during the 2018 CONCACAF Women's Championship qualification.

International goals
Scores and results list El Salvador goal tally first

See also
List of El Salvador women's international footballers

References

1996 births
Living people
Salvadoran women's footballers
Women's association football defenders
El Salvador women's international footballers